This is a list of heerlijkheden (manors) in Utrecht.

The rural parts of the province of Utrecht in the Netherlands was divided into heerlijkheden (manors). Around 1800, heerlijkheden were replaced as local jurisdictions with municipalities. See List of municipalities of Utrecht for a list of those.

Below is a complete list of manors in 1795.

's-Gravensloot
't Gein
Abcoude-Baambrugge
Abcoude-Proosdij
Achthoven, Montfoort
Achttienhoven
Amelisweerd
Amerongen
Ankeveen
Aschat
Baarn
Blokland, South Holland
Blokland, Utrecht
Breukelen Nijenrode
Breukelen Ortsgerecht
Breukelen-Proosdij
Breukelerveen
Breukelerwaard
Bunnik en Vechten
Bunschoten
Colenberg
Cothen
Darthuizen
De Bilt en Oostbroek
De Breul
De Haar
De Hegge op Themaat
Demmerik
Diemerbroek en Papekop
Dijkveld en Rateles
Doorn
Drakestein
Driebergen
Duist, De Haar en Zevenhuizen
Eemnes Binnendijks
Eemnes Buitendijks
Galekop
Gerverskop in westeinde van Harmelen en Breudijk
Gieltjesdorp
Groenestein
Grote Koppel
Hagestein
Hardenbroek
Harmelen en Haanwijk
Harmelerwaard
Heemstede
Heeswijk
Hoenkoop
Hoge en Lage Vuursche 
Honswijk
Hoogland en Emiklaar
Houten en 't Goy
Isselt
Kamerik-Houdijk
Kamerik-Mijzijde
Kattenbroek
Kattenbroek
Kersbergen
Kleine Koppel
Kockengen-Lokhorstgerecht
Kockengen-Montfoortsgerecht
Kortenhoef en Riethoven
Kudelstaart
Lage en Hoge Vuursche
Laag-Nieuwkoop
Lange en Ruige Weide
Langerak
Leersum, Ginkel en Zuilenstein
Leusden
Linschoten en Mastwijk
Linschoter Haar
Loefsgerecht van Ruwiel
Loenen
Loenersloot-Oukoop-Ter Aa
Lopik
Maarn en Maarsbergen
Maarschalkerweerd
Maarssen
Maarssenbroek
Maarsseveen
Mijdrecht
Neder-Langbroek
Nedereinde van Jutphaas
Nigtevecht
Nijendijk (Dwarsdijk)
Noordeinde van Portengen
Odijk
Oost-Raven
Oostveense landen
Oostwaard
Oudenrijn en Heikop
Oudhuizen
Oudwulven en Waaien
Oukoop
Over-Langbroek
Overeinde van Jutphaas
Overmeer
Papendorp
Polanen
Reijerscop-Kreuningen
Reijerscop-Meerloo
Renswoude
Rhijnauwen
Rijnhuizen
Rijsenburg
Rosweide
Ruwiel
Schagen en de Eng
Schalkwijk
Schonauwen
Slachtmaat
Soest en de Birkt
Spengen
Sterkenburg
Stoetwegen
Stoutenburg
Tamen en Uithoorn
Ter Eem (Eembrugge)
Themaat op den Eng
Themaat
Tienhoven
Tull en 't Waal
Uiterdijken van Mastwijk
Veenendaal
Veldhuizen
Vijfhoeven
Vinkeveen
Vleuten
Vlooswijk, Oostwijk en Kromwijk
Vreeland
Vreeswijk
Werkhoven
West-Raven
Westbroek
Willeskop en Kort Heeswijk
Willige Langerak
Wilnis en Westveen
Woudenberg
Wulven
Wulverhorst
Zegveld
Zeist
Zuideinde van Portengen
Zuilen en Zwezereng

See also 
 List of castles in the Netherlands#Utrecht

References
 W.A.G. Perks, Geschiedenis van de gemeentegrenzen in de provincie Utrecht van 1795 tot 1940 ("History of the municipal boundaries in the province Utrecht from 1795 to 1940"), Provinciale Almanak, 1962

Geography of Utrecht (province)
History of Utrecht (province)
Medieval Netherlands
Early Modern Netherlands
1790s in the Dutch Republic